Layia glandulosa is a species of flowering plant in the family Asteraceae known by the common names whitedaisy tidytips and white layia. It is native to western North America south from central Washington (state) to Baja California and east to Utah and Arizona, where it is common in a number of habitat types.

Description
The stem and foliage are dotted with dark glandular hairs and the plant is sometimes scented. The thin leaves are linear to oval-shaped, with the lower ones often lobed, approaching  in maximum length.

The flower head has a base of green, hairy, glandular phyllaries. The face is fringed with 3–14 (typically 5) broad, 3-lobed ray florets which are usually white, but sometimes yellow. The center contains yellow disc florets with yellow anthers. The fruit is a hairy achene; fruits on disc florets have a pappus of stiff white hairs.

The species is similar to Blepharipappus scaber, which has white disc flowers.

References

External links

Photo gallery

glandulosa
Flora of the West Coast of the United States
Flora of California
Flora of Baja California
Flora of British Columbia
Flora of the California desert regions
Flora of the Sierra Nevada (United States)
Natural history of the California chaparral and woodlands
Natural history of the California Coast Ranges
Natural history of the Peninsular Ranges
Natural history of the Transverse Ranges
Flora without expected TNC conservation status